Commander is a Hindi-language action drama film directed and produced by Rakesh Kumar. This film was released on 2 October 1981 under the banner of Shanti Doot Chitra. It starring Amjad Khan in lead role and Amitabh Bachchan played as a truck driver in a cameo appearance in this film only to help out his friend Amjad to promote the movie. Music direction of the film was done by Kalyanji-Anandji.

Cast

Soundtrack 
All songs were composed by Kalyanji–Anandji and penned by Anjaan.

"Tu Pappa Ka Beta Hai" - Mahendra Kapoor, Asha Bhosle, Poornima
"Mere Yaar Bina Pyar" - Kishore Kumar, Anwar
"Itni Jaldi Kya Hai" - Asha Bhosle
"Dance Music"
Duniya Wale" (Part-1) - Manhar Udhas
Duniya Wale" (Part-2) - Manhar Udhas

References

External links
 

1981 films
1980s Hindi-language films
Indian action drama films
Films scored by Kalyanji Anandji
1980s action drama films